Local elections were held in the United Kingdom in 1978.  Elections took place in the London boroughs and metropolitan districts.

The main opposition Conservative Party gained 275 seats, bringing their number of councillors to 12,645.  They gained Oldham and Havering from no overall control, and Ealing, Hillingdon, Wandsworth and Sandwell from Labour.

The governing Labour Party lost 461 seats, leaving them with 6,644 councillors.  In addition to their losses to the Conservatives they also lost South Tyneside, Hammersmith and Fulham and Wolverhampton to no overall control.

The Liberal Party lost 163 seats in total, leaving them with 923 councillors.

Summary of results

England

London boroughs

In all 32 London boroughs the whole council was up for election.

‡ New ward boundaries

Metropolitan boroughs
All 36 metropolitan borough councils had one third of their seats up for election.

District councils
In 44 districts one third of the council was up for election.

These were the first councils which had passed a resolution under section 7 (4) (b) of the Local Government Act 1972, requesting a system of elections by thirds. They could do so because they had had their new ward boundaries introduced at the 1976 elections.

Scotland

Regional councils

References

Local elections 2006. House of Commons Library Research Paper 06/26.
Vote 1999 BBC News
Vote 2000 BBC News

 
Local elections